Urwa or Urwah or "Orwah" is a given name of Arabic origin meaning strong support. It may refer to:

People
 Urwa ibn al-Ward (555–607), pre-Islamic poet
 Urwah ibn Mas'ud, semi-legendary chieftain of Taif 
 Urwah ibn Zubayr (died 713), tabi'i Muslim historian
 Urwah al-Bariqi (c.610–681), companion of Muhammad
 Urwa Tul Wusqa, Pakistani actress and model

Places
 Narimanovo Airport (ICAO code URWA), an airport in Astrakhan, Russia
 Urwa, India, a locality in Mangalore, India
 'Urwah, Saudi Arabia, a village in Al Madinah Province, Saudi Arabia
 Abu `Urwah, a village in Makkah Province, Saudi Arabia.

See also
 Al-Urwa (disambiguation)

Arabic masculine given names
Pakistani feminine given names